Sierra (Spanish for "mountain range" and "saw", from Latin serra) may refer to the following:

Places

Mountains and mountain ranges
 Sierra de Juárez, a mountain range in Baja California, Mexico 
 Sierra de las Nieves, a mountain range in Andalusia, Spain
 Sierra Madre (disambiguation), various mountain ranges
 Sierra Madre (Philippines), a mountain range in the east of Luzon, Philippines
 Sierra mountains (disambiguation)
 Sierra Nevada, a mountain range in the U.S. states of California and Nevada
 Sierra Nevada (Spain), a mountain range in Andalusia, Spain
 Sierra de San Pedro Mártir, a mountain range in Baja California, Mexico
 Sierra Maestra, a mountain range in Cuba

Other places

Africa
 Sierra Leone, a country located on the coast of West Africa

Asia
 Sierra Bullones, Bohol, Philippines

Europe
 Sierra Nevada National Park (Spain), Andalusia, Spain
 Sierra Nevada Observatory, Granada, Spain

North America
 High Sierra Trail, California, United States
 Sierra County, California
 Sierra County, New Mexico
 Sierra Foothills AVA, an American Viticultural Area in California
 Sierra National Forest, California, United States
 Sierra Sky Park Airport, Fresno, California
 Sierra Valley, in Plumas and Sierra counties, California

South America
 Sierra (Ecuador), the mountain region of Ecuador
 Sierra (Peru), the mountain region of Peru
 Sierra Nevada de Santa Marta, a national park in northern Colombia
 Sierra Nevada National Park (Venezuela), a national park in the Andean Region of Venezuela

Arts, entertainment, and media

Fictional characters
 Sierra (Dollhouse), a character in Joss Whedon's TV series Dollhouse
 Sierra, a character in The Land Before Time VII
 Sierra Burgess, the titular character in the Netflix movie Sierra Burgess Is a Loser
 Sierra McCoy, a character of Josie in the TV series Riverdale
 Sierra Obenauer, a character from the Canadian animated TV series Total Drama
 Sierra Williams, a character in the Canadian TV series Catwalk

Music
 Sierra (group), American musical artists
 Sierra (metal band), Canadian progressive rock band
 "Sierra" (song), a song by Maddie & Tae
 "Sierra", a song by Cursive from the 2003 album The Ugly Organ
 "Sierra", a song by Boz Scaggs on 1994's Some Change

Other uses in arts, entertainment, and media
 Sierra (film), a 1950 Western starring Audie Murphy
 Sierra (magazine), published by the Sierra Club
 Sierra (TV series), a 1974–1975 NBC television show produced by Universal Studios
 Sierra Entertainment, a defunct developer and publisher of video games

Computing
 Sierra (supercomputer), or ATS-2, a supercomputer for nuclear weapon simulations at Lawrence Livermore National Laboratory
 Sierra, a library management system developed by Innovative Interfaces
 macOS Sierra, the thirteenth major release of the desktop operating system from Apple Inc., formerly known as Mac OS X and OS X

Organizations
 Sierra Club, an environmental organization in the United States
 Sierra Club Canada, an environmental organization in Canada
 Sierra College, a community college located in Rocklin, California

Transportation
 Acme Sierra, an American experimental aircraft built in 1948
 Advanced Aeromarine Sierra, a glider
 Ford Sierra, a car produced by the Ford Motor Company
 GMC Sierra, various trucks and SUVs produced by General Motors
 , a ship class of the Mexican Navy
 , a Russian attack nuclear submarine
 , the name of more than one United States Navy ship
 , a United States Navy attack cargo ship named SS Sierra from 1947 to 1961 while in commercial service

Other uses
 Sierra (name)
 Sierra (retailer), an off-price retailer formerly known as Sierra Trading Post
 Pacific sierra or Mexican sierra (species Scomberomorus sierra), a Spanish mackerel fish
 PMC-Sierra, a semiconductor company
 Sierra, the NATO phonetic alphabet designation for the letter S

See also

 Cera (disambiguation)
 Cerro (disambiguation)
 La Sierra (disambiguation)
 High Sierra (disambiguation)
 Sierra Nevada (disambiguation)
 Serra (disambiguation)
 Serra (surname)
 Sierre, Switzerland
 Jamón serrano, Spanish for "Sierra ham"